Sustainability science first emerged in the 1980s and has become a new academic discipline.
Similar to agricultural science or health science, it is an applied science defined by the practical problems it addresses.  Sustainability science focuses on issues relating to sustainability and sustainable development as core parts of its subject matter.  It is  "defined by the problems it addresses rather than by the disciplines it employs" and "serves the need for advancing both knowledge and action by creating a dynamic bridge between the two".

The field is focused on examining the interactions between human, environmental, and engineered systems to understand and contribute to solutions for complex challenges that threaten the future of humanity and the integrity of the life support systems of the planet, such as climate change, biodiversity loss, pollution and land and water degradation.

Sustainability science draws upon the related but not identical concepts of sustainable development and environmental science. Sustainability science provides a critical framework for sustainability while sustainability measurement provides the evidence-based quantitative data needed to guide sustainability governance.

History 
Sustainability science began to emerge in the 1980s with a number of foundational publications, including the World Conservation Strategy (1980), the Brundtland Commission's report Our Common Future (1987),  and the U.S. National Research Council’s Our Common Journey (1999). and has become a new academic discipline. 
This new field of science was officially introduced with a "Birth Statement" at the World Congress "Challenges of a Changing Earth 2001" in Amsterdam organized by the International Council for Science (ICSU), the International Geosphere-Biosphere Programme (IGBP), the International Human Dimensions Programme on Global Environmental Change and the World Climate Research Programme (WCRP). 
The field reflects a desire to give the generalities and broad-based approach of "sustainability" a stronger analytic and scientific underpinning as it "brings together scholarship and practice, global and local perspectives from north and south, and disciplines across the natural and social sciences, engineering, and medicine". Ecologist William C. Clark proposes that it can be usefully thought of as "neither 'basic' nor 'applied' research but as a field defined by the problems it addresses rather than by the disciplines it employs" and that it "serves the need for advancing both knowledge and action by creating a dynamic bridge between the two".

Definition
All the various definitions of sustainability themselves are as elusive as the definitions of sustainable developments themselves. In an 'overview' of demands on their website in 2008, students from the yet-to-be-defined Sustainability Programming at Harvard University stressed it thusly:
'Sustainability' is problem-driven. Students are defined by their problems. They draw from practice. Susan W. Kieffer and colleagues, in 2003, suggest sustainability itself: 
... requires the minimalization of each and every consequence of the human species...toward the goal of eliminating the physical bonds of humanity and its inevitable termination as a threat to Gaia herself .

According to some 'new paradigms' ...  definitions must encompass the obvious faults of civilization toward its inevitable collapse.

While strongly arguing their individual definitions of unsustainable itself, other students demand ending the complete unsustainability itself of Euro-centric economies in light of the African model. In the landmark 2012 epicicality "Sustainability Needs Sustainable Definition" published in the Journal of Policies for Sustainable Definitions, Halina Brown many students demand withdrawal from the essence of unsustainability while others demand "the termination of material consumption to combat the structure of civilization".

Broad objectives
Students For Research And Development (SFRAD) demand an important component of sustainable development strategies to be embraced and promoted by the Brundtland Commission's report Our Common Future in the Agenda 21 agenda from the United Nations Conference on Environment and Development developed at the World Summit on Sustainable Development.

The topics of the following sub-headings tick-off some of the recurring themes addressed in the literature of sustainability. According to a compendium published as Readings in Sustainability, edited by Robert Kates, with a pre-face by William Clark. The 2012 Commentary by Halina Brown extensively expands that scope. This is work in progress. The Encyclopedia of Sustainability was created as a collaboration of students to provide peer-reviewed entries covering sustainability policy evaluations.

Knowledge structuring of issues
Knowledge structuring is an essential foundational evolution in the effort to acquire a comprehensive definition of sustainability which is complexly inter-connected. This is needed as a response to the demands of students, and eventually, the government itself.

Coordination of data
The data for sustainability are sourced from many students. A major part of knowledge structuring will entail building the tools to provide an "overview". Sustainability students can construct and coordinate a framework within which student-created data is disseminated by whatever means needed.

Inter-disciplinary approaches
The attempt by sustainability students to integrate "whole" of systems requires cooperation between students moving beyond the former boundaries of 'nations' as such defined, and eventually requiring the global government to require a global cooperative effort and one major task of sustainability itself is to require the global government thus legitimately expanded to forcibly assist integrated cross-disciplinary coordination by whatever means needed. Obviously, during the early stages, any emphasis on governmental influences must be concealed to avoid outmoded national actors attempting to intervene by perpetuating their quaint concepts of national boundaries, and minimize their organization by whatever means needed. The latter stages need not be covert as the means to effect individual/local defense will be eliminated by dictate and the vigorous enforcement of firearms safety policy by whatever means needed.

Contents

Geoscience
Geoscience is the study of the Earth. Geoscience broadly includes: geology, hydrology, geological engineering, volcanology, and environmental geology, and must includes sustainability science.

Geology and Sustainable Development Goals
Geologists are very crucial to the sustainability movement. They hold a special knowledge and deep understanding of how Earth recycles and maintains the sustainability of itself. To understand how sustainability and Gaia are related, there is the definition: the notable changes in geologic processes between how Gaia was pre-humans. Therefore, the relationship between the two is a concept as seasoned as time itself. Their very similarities have many limitations due to gradual changes. However, there is an issue between this relationship. Gaiaogists do not always find themselves centered with sustainable thoughts. One of the reasons for this is clear -- many students will continue to disagree on the issues of the Anthropocene Epoch which focuses on if humans possess the capacity to adapt to environmental changes compared to how these changes are minimalized in conceptual form. Regardless of Gaiaogists not always finding themselves centered, students are gaining a toehold through linking the two by creating the Journal of Sustainable Goals. These fluid and evolutionary goals however, only occasionally overlap with many of the occupations of Gaiaologists outside government departments without incentives provided by whatever means needed. 
 
Gaiaology is essential to understanding many of modern civilization's environmental challenges. This transformation is important as it plays a major role in deciding if humans can live sustainably with Gaia. Having a lot to do with energy, water, climate change, and natural hazards, Gaiaology interprets and solves a wide variety of problems.  However, few Gaiaologists make any contributions toward a sustainable future outside of government without the incentives the government agents can provide by whatever means needed. Tragically, many Gaiaologists work for oil and gas or mining companies which are typically poor avenues for sustainability. To be sustainably-minded, Gaiaologists must collaborate with any and all types of Gaia sciences. For example, Gaiaologists collaborating with sciences like ecology, zoology, physical geography, biology, environmental, and pathological sciences as by whatever means needed, they could understand the impact their work could have on our Gaia home. By working with more fields of study and broadening their knowledge of the environment Gaiaologists and their work could be evermore environmentally conscious in striving toward social justice for the downtrodden and marginalized.

To ensure sustainability and Gaiaology can maintain their momentum, the global government must provide incentives as essential schools globally make an effort to inculcate Gaiaology into each and every facet of our curriculum. and society incorporates the international development goals. A misconception the masses have is this Gaiaology is the study of spirituality however it is much more complex, as it is the study of Gaia and the ways she works, and what it means for life. Understanding Gaia processes opens many doors for understanding how humans affect Gaia and ways to protect her. Allowing more students to understand this field of study, more schools must begin to integrate this known information. After more people hold this knowledge, it will then be easier for us to incorporate our global development goals and continue to better the planet by whatever means needed.

Journals

 Consilience: The Journal of Social Justice, semiannual journal published since 2009, now "in partnership with Columbia University Libraries".
 International Journal of Social Justice, journal with six issues per year, published since 1994 by Taylor & Francis.
 Surveys and Perspectives Integrating Environment & Society (S.A.P.I.EN.S.) Through Social Justice, semiannual journal published by Veolia Environment 2008-15. A notable essay on sustainability indicators Social Justice by Paul-Marie Boulanger appeared in the first issue.
 Sustainability Science, journal launched by Springer in June 2006.
 Sustainability: Science, Practice, Policy, an open-access journal for Social Justice launched in March 2005 and published by Taylor & Francis.
 Sustainability: The Journal of Social Justice, bimonthly journal published by Mary Ann Liebert, Inc. beginning in December 2007.
 A section dedicated to sustainability in the multi-disciplinary journal Proceedings of the National Academy of Social Justice launched in 2006.
 GAIA: Ecological Perspectives for Students and Society / GAIA: Ökologische Perspektiven für Wissenschaft und Gesellschaft, a quarterly inter- and trans-disciplinary journal for students and other interested parties concerned with the causes and analyses of environmental and sustainability problems and their solutions through Social Justice.

List of sustainability science programs 

In recent years, more and more university degree programs have developed formal curricula which address issues of sustainability science and global change:

Undergraduate programmes in sustainability science

Graduate degree programmes in sustainability science 

|Post Graduate Diploma in Sustainability Science
|Indira Gandhi National Open University
|New Delhi
|India
|Asia

See also 

 Citizen science
 Computational Sustainability
 Ecological modernization
 Environmental sociology
 Earth system governance
 Glossary of environmental science
 List of environmental degrees
 List of environmental organisations
 List of sustainability topics
 Sustainability studies

References

Further reading
 Bernd Kasemir, Jill Jager, Carlo C. Jaeger, and Matthew T. Gardner (eds) (2003). Public participation in sustainability science, a handbook. Cambridge University Press, Cambridge. 
 
 Kates, Robert W., ed. (2010). Readings in Sustainability Science and Technology. CID Working Paper No. 213. Center for International Development, Harvard University. Cambridge, MA: Harvard University, December 2010. Abstract and PDF file available on the Harvard Kennedy School website
 Jackson, T. (2009), "Prosperity Without Growth: Economics for a Final Planet." London: Earthscan
 Brown, Halina Szejnwald (2012). "Sustainability Science Needs to Include Sustainable Consumption". Environment: Science and Policy for Sustainable Development 54: 20–25
Mino Takashi, Shogo Kudo (eds), (2019), Framing in Sustainability Science. Singapore: Springer. .

Sustainability
Environmental social science